Ballysloe is a townland on the R689 regional road in County Tipperary.

Townlands of County Tipperary